Major Diana Mary Henderson (1946–2019) was a solicitor, historian and officer in the Women's Royal Army Corps.  She later worked as the director of development at Hopetoun House and Queens' College, Cambridge.  Her interests included boxing, horse-riding and playing the bagpipes.

References

1946 births
2019 deaths
Military personnel from Guildford
Alumni of the University of Strathclyde
Bagpipe players
British women boxers
British equestrians
Fellows of Queens' College, Cambridge 
People educated at Hawick High School
People from Guildford
British solicitors
British historians
Women's Royal Army Corps officers